Miankuh Mahalleh (also Romanized as Mīānkūh Maḩalleh; also known as Mīānkū Maḩalleh) is a village in Baladeh Rural District, Khorramabad District, Tonekabon County, Mazandaran Province, Iran. At the 2006 census, its population was 538, in 140 families.

References 

Populated places in Tonekabon County